Richton Park is a village and a southern suburb of Chicago in Cook County, Illinois, United States. The population was 12,775 at the 2020 census. The community was named after a Richton in Vermont, the native home of a first settler.

Geography
Richton Park is located at  (41.481992, -87.725352).

The village is bordered by Matteson to the north, Park Forest to the east, and University Park to the south.

Tornado
On Saturday June 7, 2008, an EF2 tornado went through Richton Park around 6:00pm. The tornado tore apart the Richton Square Apartments damaging 40 units and leaving at least 80 residents homeless. Some commercial properties along Sauk Trail were also heavily damaged. The tornado continued northeast through Park Forest before dissipating near the intersection of Lincoln highway and Western avenue.

Demographics
As of the 2020 census there were 12,775 people, 5,244 households, and 3,298 families residing in the village. The racial makeup of the village was 6.64% White, 86.61% African American, 0.28% Native American, 0.78% Asian, 0.01% Pacific Islander, 1.80% from other races, and 3.87% from two or more races. Hispanic or Latino of any race were 4.24% of the population.

There were 5,244 households, out of which 41.42% had children under the age of 18 living with them, 36.78% were married couples living together, 20.50% had a female householder with no husband present, and 37.11% were non-families. 35.87% of all households were made up of individuals, and 15.24% had someone living alone who was 65 years of age or older. The average household size was 3.32 and the average family size was 2.52.

The village's age distribution consisted of 19.6% under the age of 18, 14.8% from 18 to 24, 20.1% from 25 to 44, 32% from 45 to 64, and 13.6% who were 65 years of age or older. The median age was 42.1 years. For every 100 females, there were 94.5 males. For every 100 females age 18 and over, there were 87.4 males.

The median income for a household in the village was $63,777, and the median income for a family was $82,208. Males had a median income of $49,393 versus $43,399 for females. The per capita income for the village was $28,756. About 8.3% of families and 11.4% of the population were below the poverty line, including 8.6% of those under age 18 and 25.1% of those age 65 or over.

Note: the US Census treats Hispanic/Latino as an ethnic category. This table excludes Latinos from the racial categories and assigns them to a separate category. Hispanics/Latinos can be of any race.

Education
Matteson School District 162 is headquartered in Richton Park and serves as the primary district.

Richton Square School
Sauk Elementary School
Illinois Elementary School
Matteson Elementary School
O.W. Huth Middle School

Elementary School District 159 serves portions of Richton Park.
Neil A. Armstrong School
Colin Powell Middle School 
Marya Yates Elementary School
Sieden Prairie Elementary School
Woodgate Elementary School

Rich Township High School and Southland College Preparatory Charter High School are the two public high schools that serve Richton Park, both schools are located in the village.

The Richton Park Public Library District has served the village since 1972.

Notable places
 Rich City Skate (Formerly Olympic Skate World) - Featured in the HBO documentary United Skates, highlighting African American roller skating rinks.

Government
Richton Park is in Illinois's 2nd congressional district.

References

External links
 Village of Richton Park official website
 Richton Park Public Library District

Villages in Illinois
Villages in Cook County, Illinois
Chicago metropolitan area
Majority-minority cities and towns in Cook County, Illinois